Virginia Gonzalez Torres is a female human rights activist in Mexico who provides support and resources for the mentally ill. She is often referred to as the Dorothea Dix of Mexico.

Born into a wealthy family that owned a pharmacy chain, Virginia began a volunteer women's program at Sayago hospital in the 1980s. In her investigative role, she has sneaked into most of the public mental institutions in Mexico, sometimes posing as a patient, and she once smuggled the mayor of Mexico City into a men's mental hospital to view the conditions there. More than once she has been beaten up at institutions when she was discovered inside hiding in the dark.

In 1992 Virginia helped make men's mental hospital Ramirez Moreno infamous by filming conditions inside. In 1995, she helped draft a new mental health law.

A Look at the Soul 
Virginia Gonzalez Torres was born in Mexico City, the daughter of Margarita Torres de la Parra and Roberto González Terán. He began his approach to the issue of human rights of the mentally ill when he faces 22 years to an episode that changed his life. Her older sister is hospitalized in a private psychiatric hospital in the United States, to be attended by depression. It was then that Virginia could see that, the psychiatric world, a world of confinement, punishment, neglect and suffering. When visiting her sister in the hospital daily, was awaken their interest in these places, then he realized that he had isolation rooms where patients could stay for days as part of treatment. 
Over the years Virginia was getting closer to the Psychiatric Hospital in Mexico now, his great ability to empathize with clients allowed them to look at the person behind the diagnosis and may feel their needs, was then given account that has found a cause to fight for the defense of human rights of people with mental illness.

Her Work in Civil Society 
Virginia Gonzalez Torres prepares to visit psychiatric hospitals and is aware of the continuing human rights violations, lack of medical care, facilities deplorable lack of clothing and footwear, food in poor condition, in order that the deal was outrageous. Therefore decided to create the Mexican Foundation for Rehabilitation of Persons with mental illness, IAP, which started operations on November 14, 1980, being an institution of nonprofit private assistance, is a pioneer in Mexico in the fight for respect for human rights of the mentally ill. In the same year, coordinating a community psychosocial rehabilitation program at the Hospital "José Sayago", who then becomes a very significant place for Virginia, since the first public psychiatric hospital where he comes to begin what would later Psychiatric Reform in Mexico.  
Thus, by the Virginia Foundation continues to develop community programs aimed at the Psychosocial Rehabilitation in 1985 such as the "Center Day" being the first program of its kind in Mexico. Following this task in 1988, the Foundation is launching the program "Community Residence" thought in people with mental illness who have been discharged from public psychiatric hospitals and lack of family support and economic resources, this program is free and supports users in their process of reintegration into society. 
Virginia González's work was extended to other hospitals and in 1988 together with the Foundation organized a psychosocial rehabilitation program in the Psychiatric Hospital "Dr. Samuel Ramirez Moreno". Virginia's vision is to promote the participation of users of mental health services in the defense of their human rights, so the front of the Mexican Foundation for Psychosocial Rehabilitation, achieved during the keynote of the Congress of the World Mental Health, held in Mexico, involving users at the same time presented the "Charter of Human Rights of people suffering from mental illness and are hospitalized" as a cornerstone in the fight for the Defense of Human Rights.  
One of the legacies of Virginia Gonzalez Torres is the creation of citizen committees, who have the task of ensuring respect for human rights in their struggle for recognition has been achieved these committees to Secretary of Health and have access to all the administrative and budget of the institution. The first steering committee was established Psychiatric Hospital "Dr. Samuel Ramirez Moreno. "

Allegations of Human Rights Violations of the Mentally Ill 
One of the tasks of the Foundation is publicly denounce human rights violations of people with mental illness in 1992, a complaint before the National Commission on Human Rights for violations at "Samuel Ramirez Moreno, this action is for a year after the Commission made a series of recommendations to address the abuse allegations.

Participation in the International Field 
Virginia Gonzalez's work has transcended the international field in 1994 during the session of the Human Rights Commission United Nations in Geneva, Switzerland, Virginia on behalf of the FMREM presented to the plenary of the Assembly a report on violations Human rights in Mexico's public mental hospitals, thus manages to foreground the issue at international level that exists in Mexico.

Official Standard NOM-025-SSA2-1994 
The tireless struggle of one of Virginia Gonzalez pays off when in 1995, holding with the foundation in the development of the NOM-025-SSA2-1994, which governs the provision of services in units of Hospital Care Medical-Psychiatric in Mexico. It gets its publication in July 1995 and will be included in the standard list of human rights of mentally ill in hospital, before the foundation promoted by addition of rules establishing the citizens' committees in all Psychiatric Hospitals country.

Psychosocial Rehabilitation 
Virginia Gonzalez believes that the asylum model Psychiatric Hospitals does not contribute to the rehabilitation of the mentally ill, advocates a new treatment, where users of such services have benefits to help them reintegrate into society, so in 1998, promotes actions that lead users to participate in the workshop receive financial support, promotes mental hospitals in the outputs of the user community, and organizes workshops in four state psychiatric hospitals, which also manages the articles sold in stores within these mental hospitals are given at cost to users.

A Hope 
Thanks to a public outcry by Virginia Gonzalez in 1999, closing the Ocaranza Psychiatric Hospital. At the same time there is a hope for the mentally ill who are admitted to this hospital, because in 2000, were inaugurated transitional villas hospital, whose goal is to leave the overcrowded and have a decent space in which to carry out activities that will lead to rehabilitation. They also open two halfway houses that support the reintegration of users who have been discharged from hospital.

Work from Government 
The way Virginia has started from the Civil Society, perseverance and courage have enabled him to be recognized as the leading advocate of human rights of mental patients in Mexico. In 2000 assumed the post of Deputy Director of Psychosocial Rehabilitation in the Ministry of Health, from there its purpose is to generate large changes in psychiatric care for the benefit of the mentally ill. Virginia has not been a common public servant, but has shown its true commitment to defending human rights and is the first to withdraw if the government is not doing well, example is the mobilization that led in 2003 being a civil servant. A picket in front of the headquarters of the dependence of the Secretary of Health Julio Frenk require the Secretary to respond to patients 'lifers' with the system of psychiatric asylum. This mobilization makes the secretary agreed to install a desk, coordinated by Virginia Gonzalez Torres, to develop a plan to implement the so-called "Model Hidalgo" mental health care for the benefit of 2 000 400 patients who have been granted asylum different psychiatric hospitals in the country for 20 years, on average.

Miguel Hidalgo as a Role Model 
This new model provides for the establishment of new structures of care and is based on respect for the rights of users to receive comprehensive medical care-psychiatric quality and warmth. The model provides a network of services with different alternatives for prevention, hospitalization and social reintegration in the area of mental health.

National Council for Mental Health 
In 2004, establishing the National Council of Mental Health and is named Virginia Technical Secretariat, recognizing his work for over thirty years in the Defence of Human Rights of the Mentally Ill. During his tenure on the Council its main objective is to promote the Psychiatric Reform for the Restructuring of Psychiatric Services System and Mental Health in Mexico, which signed 27 states in 2006. This model is intended to implement the Miguel Hidalgo in the country. 
During his tenure on the Council, visit Virginia Psychiatric hospitals in the country, in 2005, visiting the Psychiatric Durango, realizes that this is the place where most frequently practice the use of electroshock, for what is against this practice, encouraged to seek other, less invasive to patients, makes a commitment to managing the inclusion of psychiatric medications in the catalog of the Seguro Popular to the lack of medications is not an excuse to use the electric shocks. In January 2006, Virginia Gonzalez Torres, performing observations at Psychiatric Hospital "José Sayago", found that he violated the human rights of detained 290 patients, with this panorama, the federal agency claims that the state government, "not unable or unwilling to intervene in the matter, "that allows the Health Department take responsibility for the Hospital to implement the model of psychiatric care Miguel Hidalgo.

Revolution in the Sayago Hospital 
Virginia has been particularly attentive to the Hospital José Sayago, as it was in the place where he began his work with volunteer groups. On October 19, 2006 Villages were opened in the hospital transition Sayago Hospital, the latter being crucial action to continue implementing the Model Miguel Hidalgo on behalf of users. Later in the year 2009 takes action to continue the revolution within the hospital. A goal is to care for the users who are treated here is made from a humanistic approach, where doctors see the users as individuals and not as a diagnostic label, and they can receive quality medical care and warmth. With hospital nurses made a special approach recognizes the importance of their work and urges them to comply with the highest quality standards but above all warmth. It serves the needs of nurses in training, human resources and materials. Propose an organization of hospital units where work is organized with a multidisciplinary approach. Boost campaign is counting on me, count on you "for the purpose of bringing doctors and nurses to clients from a non-hierarchical position, but person to person.

Autism 
A topic of interest to Virginia is the care of children with autism spectrum disorders, so that in 2009, opened the Autism Clinic, which provides specialized care during their first year of operation awarded 28, 800 and took care consultations more than 400 children. Another action in relation to Autism Walk was "Together for Autism" on March 26 to mark the World Day of Conscience on Autism, which is on April 2, the walk had the participation of more than 3000 people.

Free Consultations for 2,009 Patients 
A fight of Virginia Gonzalez Torres, has been to seek free of Mental Health Services, recognizing that most people with these conditions can not afford medicines and consultations are required. Thus consultations given by the Center City Comprehensive Mental Health does not charge any consultation. Following this, in 2009, following a dialogue work, the Chamber of Deputies proposing an agreement for exemption of payments to persons who are served annually in federal health facilities and lack of social insurance, or ISSSTE Seguro Popular
Virginia Gonzalez Torres continues to lead the National Mental Health Council at the end of 2009 reported isolation rooms at the Psychiatric Hospital Adolfo. M. Nieto, a situation that eventually uncovered several irregularities that caused the dismissal of the authorities.  
He is currently working on amendments to the NOM-025-SSA, in order to continue promoting the reform of psychiatry in Mexico and thus make respect for human rights of the mentally ill is part of the daily life of all Mexicans.

See also
Mental Disability Rights International

References

Mexican human rights activists
Women human rights activists
Year of birth missing (living people)
Living people